Al-Abadah also spelled Obada or Abbadeh, is a Syrian village located in Markaz Rif Dimashq, Rif Dimashq to the southeast of the al-Nashabiyah nahiyah ("subdistrict"). According to the Syria Central Bureau of Statistics (CBS), Al-Abadah had a population of 6,385 in the 2004 census.

See also

References

Populated places in Markaz Rif Dimashq District
Populated coastal places in Syria